Jennifer Herold (born March 26, 1985) was a candidate for the 2018 Democratic nomination for the United States House of Representatives from Ohio's 16th District. Jennifer announced her candidacy with a post on the popular parenting website Scary Mommy.

She previously ran as a Republican for the Ohio House of Representatives for the 7th District in 2016.

Herold is a graduate of Bowling Green State University, as well as the University of Toledo where she obtained her Doctorate of Occupational Therapy. She is married and has two sons and one daughter.

She rose to national prominence as an advocate for working mothers when her opponent questioned her ability to run for office as well as take care of her children. The story was picked up by outlets such as The Today Show, Huffington Post, and Christian Science Monitor.

She is a strong advocate for mental health programming, early childhood education, and citizen representation.

References

Living people
Republican Party (United States) politicians
1985 births
Ohio Republicans
Ohio Democrats